Podprudnoye Lake is a small lake lying just southeast of Prilednikovoye Lake in Schirmacher Hills, Queen Maud Land. It was mapped by the Soviet Antarctic Expedition in 1961 and named Ozero Podprudnoye ("by-the-pond lake").

Lakes of Queen Maud Land
Princess Astrid Coast